Clare Hall Boat Club is the boat club for members of Clare Hall, Cambridge, a constituent college of the University of Cambridge. 
Clare Hall Boat Club is the youngest (founded 1995) and one of the smallest boat clubs in Cambridge.

Clare Hall won the Pegasus Cup in 2010 and 2019, awarded annually to the most successful college boat club at the May Bumps (measured by a points system based on how many places a club moves up the rankings). Despite being a young club, Clare Hall has achieved blades eight times in the bumps races, the most recent being in 2019 for the men's team and 2016 for the women's team.

References

External links
 CUCBC/ Cambridge University Combined Boat Club
 Clare Hall Boat Club

Rowing clubs of the University of Cambridge
Boat
Sports clubs established in 1995
1995 establishments in England
Rowing clubs in Cambridgeshire
Rowing clubs in England
Rowing clubs of the River Cam